Harry Foster may refer to:
 Harry Foster (cricketer) (1873–1950), real name Henry, cricketer who played for Oxford University and Worcestershire
 Sir Harry Foster (politician) (1855–1938), British Conservative Party politician, Member of Parliament 1892–1900, 1910, 1924–1929
 Harry C. Foster (1871–1917), American politician
 Harry Wickwire Foster (1902–1964), Canadian World War II general
 Harry Foster (footballer), English footballer

See also
Harold Foster (disambiguation)
Henry Foster (disambiguation)